Gülcemal Kadın ("face of rose"  1826 – 29 November 1851) was a consort of Sultan Abdulmejid I, and the mother of Sultan Mehmed V of the Ottoman Empire.

Early life
Of Bosnian origin, Gülcemal Kadın was born in 1826 at Sarajevo. She had one sister named Bimisal Hanım. She was also related to Sabit Bey, who became Master of Robes to her son Sultan Mehmed Reşad, and his sister, the Sultan's Sixth Hazinedar, Nevfer Kalfa. She was blonde, known for her extraordinary beauty, but of delicate health.

Marriage
Gülcemal married Abdulmejid in 1840, and was given the title of "Third Ikbal". She was one of the most beloved comsorts.

On 1 November 1840, she gave birth to her first child, a daughter, Fatma Sultan in the Old Beşiktaş Palace.

In 1842, she was elevated to the title of "Second Ikbal". On 3 February 1842, she gave birth to two twins daughters, Refia Sultan and Hatice Sultan (who died as newborn) in the Old Beşiktaş Palace. 

In 1843 she was elevated to the title of "Fifth Kadın". On 2 November 1844, she gave birth to her fourth child, a son, Şehzade Mehmed Reşad (future Mehmed V) in the Old Çırağan Palace. In 1845, she was elevated to the title of "Fourth Kadın".

Death
She died of tuberculosis on 29 November 1851 in Istanbul. She was never Valide sultan to her son, because she died before Mehmed Reşad's accession to the Ottoman throne. She is buried in the mausoleum of the imperial ladies at the New Mosque Istanbul.

All the three of her alive children were adopted by Servetseza Kadın, first wife of Abdulmejid.

Really beloved by Abdülmecid, he did everything to save her life. To her doctor, İsmail Paşah, he declared: ”… I have had the most genuine conversations with this woman. Since I was a youth, I have loved her with my all heart..“.

Legacy
The ocean liner SS Germanic (1874) was renamed Gul Djemal when she entered the Ottoman service in 1911, in memory of Gülcemal Kadın. When the ship was sold yet again, this time to Turkiye Seyrisefain Idaresi, it was renamed Gulcemal.

Issue

In literature
Gülcemal is a character in Hıfzı Topuz's historical novel Abdülmecit: İmparatorluk Çökerken Sarayda 22 Yıl: Roman (2009).

See also
Kadın (title)
Ottoman Imperial Harem
List of consorts of the Ottoman sultans
List of mothers of the Ottoman sultans

References

Sources
 

1826 births
1851 deaths
19th-century deaths from tuberculosis
Tuberculosis deaths in the Ottoman Empire
Consorts of Abdulmejid I
Mothers of Ottoman sultans